The ARAM Periodical is an annual peer-reviewed academic journal published by the Aram Society for Syro-Mesopotamian Studies covering Ancient Near East studies with a particular focus on Aramaic studies, including archaeology, religious studies, philology, patristics, and other related topics.

History
The ARAM Society for Syro-Mesopotamian Studies was founded at the University of Oxford on 24 January 1987. The society published the first volume of its periodical in 1989. From 1995 to 2012 the journal was published by Peeters Publishers on behalf of the society. Originally published biannually, the journal switched to annual publication in 2000.

Abstracting and indexing
The journal is abstracted and indexed in the ATLA Religion Database, L'Année philologique, Linguistic Bibliography, and the Modern Language Association Database.

References

External links

ARAM Society

Publications established in 1989
Ancient Near East journals
English-language journals
Annual journals
Archaeology journals
Aram (region)